Call Me may refer to:

Language 

 The name in the Unicode database for the gesture emoji 🤙

Films 

Call Me (film), a 1988 erotic thriller
Call Me: The Rise and Fall of Heidi Fleiss, a 2004 TV movie about "Hollywood Madam" Heidi Fleiss

Music

Albums 
Call Me (Al Green album), and the title song, "Call Me (Come Back Home)" (see below)
Call Me (Sylvester album)
Call Me (EP), by Diamond Head, and the title song

Songs 
"Call Me" (Andrea True Connection song), 1976
"Call Me" (Anna Vissi song), 2004
"Call Me" (Aretha Franklin song), 1970; notably covered by Diana Ross (1971) and by Phil Perry (1991)
"Call Me" (Blondie song), theme from the film American Gigolo, 1980
"Call Me" (Deee-Lite song), 1994
"Call Me" (Deejay Jay feat. Pandora song), 2008
"Call Me" (Feminnem song), the Bosnian and Herzegovinian entry in the Eurovision Song Contest 2005
"Call Me" (Go West song), 1985
"Call Me" (Jamelia song), 2000
"Call Me" (Le Click song), 1997
"Call Me" (Nav and Metro Boomin song), 2017
"Call Me" (Petula Clark song), 1965; notably covered by Chris Montez (1965)
"Call Me" (Skyy song), 1981
"Call Me" (Spagna song), 1986
"Call Me" (Tweet song), 2002
"Call Me (Come Back Home)", by Al Green, 1973
"Call Me", by Bonnie Tyler from Angel Heart
"Call Me", by Carly Pearce from Carly Pearce
"Call Me", by Dennis DeYoung from Back to the World
"Call Me", by Golden Earring from Winter-Harvest
"Call Me", by Imelda May from Life Love Flesh Blood
"Call Me", by Kimbra from Vows
"Call Me", by the Louvin Brothers from Encore
"Call Me", by Marcos Hernandez
"Call Me", by Neiked
"Call Me", by Queen + Paul Rodgers from The Cosmos Rocks
"Call Me", by Ringo Starr from Goodnight Vienna
"Call Me", by Sarah Klang, 2019
"Call Me", by Shinedown from The Sound of Madness
"Call Me", by St. Paul and The Broken Bones
"Call Me", by Taegoon from 1st Mini Album
"Call Me", by Throwing Muses from Throwing Muses
"Call Me", by Tricky from Juxtapose
"Call Me", by UFO from You Are Here
"Call Me", by Way Out West from Intensify
"Call Me (She Said)", by Joell Ortiz from Free Agent

See also

Call on Me (disambiguation)
"Call Me Maybe", by Carly Rae Jepsen